Holstenstraße is a railway station in Hamburg, Germany, located in the quarter of Altona-Nord in the borough of Altona. It is served by the rapid transit trains of the Hamburg S-Bahn network as well as AKN regional commuter trains. The station is managed by  DB Station&Service.

The station is situated directly beside the  Neue Flora musical theatre and close to the Holsten Brewery. It was the focus of significant media attention in 2005 after people at the station's bus stop allegedly eavesdropped three men planning a terrorist attack, resulting in a large-scale police investigation.

History
On 28 September 1883, a Holstenstraße station was opened for a horsecar line, from Millerntornear Reeperbahnto Holstenstraße.

In 1893, the station was built elevated, as an alternate for the at-grade station called Schulterblatt at the current location. The station was part of the link line from Hamburg central station to Altona central station. During the bombing of Hamburg in World War II in 1943, the station building was destroyed and provisionally rebuild. In the end of the 1980s, the Station was completely renovated, with a new platform building and entrance.

Layout
Holstenstraße is an elevated railway station with an island platform and two tracks. There is no personnel attending the station, but SOS and information telephones and ticket machines are available. Through a lift the station is accessible for handicapped persons.

Tracks of the long distance and regional trains are separated, these trains do not stop at Holstenstraße station.

Services
The station is served by the line S11, S21 and S31 of the Hamburg S-Bahn, and the line A1 of the AKN. The city trains calls the station every 5 to 10 minutes in the rush hours. On weekdays the service stops around midnight and starts at 4 a.m. On weekend nights the city trains are calling the station round-the-clock every 30 minutes. The AKN commuter trains are calling the station only during the rush hours.

The passengers can change to several bus lines in front of the station. There is also a taxicab stand. A small shop is in the entrance of the station building.

See also
Hamburger Verkehrsverbund

References

External links

Hamburg S-Bahn stations
Railway stations in Hamburg
Buildings and structures in Altona, Hamburg
Hamburg Holstenstra